Carex buchananii, common names Buchanan's sedge, cutty grass, is a species of sedge (in the Cyperaceae family). It is endemic to New Zealand, being found on both the North and South Islands.

It has no synonyms according to Plants of the world online, but two  according to the New Zealand Plant Conservation Network

Description
It is a reddish-brown, densely tufted sedge.

It flowers from October to December and fruits from November to June and the nuts are dispersed by granivory and wind.

Distribution & habitat
It is uncommon in the North Island, being found south of the Manawatu. In the South Island it is found more widely but has not been found in Westland and Fiordland. It is found from the coast to the mountains (to an altitude of 1000 m) growing on beaches and lake and stream margins.

Conservation status
Assessments under the New Zealand Threat Classification System (NZTCS), declared it to be "Not Threatened" in 2013, but in 2017  to be "At Risk - Declining" (Dec).

In the UK it is naturalised and considered an invasive species.

Taxonomy & naming 
It was first described in 1880 by Sven Berggren, who gave it the specific epithet, Buchanani (now buchananii), to honour the New Zealand botanist, John Buchanan (1819-1898).

References

External links
Carex buchananii New Zealand Plant Conservation Network 
Carex buchananii occurrence data from GBIF

buchananii
Plants described in 1885
Taxa named by Donald Petrie
Flora of New Zealand
Plants described in 1880
Taxa named by Sven Berggren